is a retired male backstroke swimmer from Japan. He represented his native country at the 1996 Summer Olympics in Atlanta, Georgia.

References

1978 births
Living people
Japanese male backstroke swimmers
Olympic swimmers of Japan
Swimmers at the 1996 Summer Olympics
Universiade medalists in swimming
Sportspeople from Kanagawa Prefecture
Universiade silver medalists for Japan
Medalists at the 1999 Summer Universiade
20th-century Japanese people